Minija is a river in western Lithuania and a tributary to Nemunas. It begins from small Lake Didovas, and hydrographically from lake Sydeklis, 14 km south of Telšiai. The rivulet that flows out of Sydeklis here is called Mava, in between Lake Ilgis and Lake Pluotinalis - Kliurkė and only after Lake Didovo it gets the Minija name.

It flows through Lakes Ilgis, Pluotinalis, Didovas, and Gargždai, Priekulė towns before reaching the Atmata distributary of the Nemunas delta.

In 1873 a channel, called "Vilhelmo kanalas" was built that connected Minija directly with Klaipėda port.

Tributary rivers
Left: Pala, Alantas, Žvelsa, Agluona, Veiviržas, Tenenys
Right: Sausdaravas, Babrungas, Mišupė, Salnatas

References

Rivers of Lithuania